Alain Jakubowicz (born 2 May 1953) is a French lawyer from Villeurbanne, in the suburbs of Lyon.

He was the president of the LICRA from January 31, 2010 to November 6, 2017.

He is also known for defending Nordahl Lelandais during the Maëlys de Araujo case.

Biography
Alain Jakubowicz's parents, Jews from Poland and Austria, migrated to France in 1933. His father founded a spindle manufacturing company in Lyon.

References

1953 births
Living people
20th-century French lawyers
21st-century French lawyers
People from Villeurbanne
20th-century French Jews
Officiers of the Légion d'honneur
Knights of the Ordre national du Mérite